The Best of John Brunner is a collection of science fiction short stories by British author John Brunner. It was first published in paperback by Ballantine/Del Rey in November 1988 as a volume in its Classic Library of Science Fiction.

Summary
The book contains seventeen short works of fiction by the author, together with an introduction by Joe Haldeman.

Contents
"Introduction: The Brunner Mosaic" (Joe Haldeman)
"The Totally Rich" (from Worlds of Tomorrow, Jun. 1963)
"The Last Lonely Man" (from New Worlds SF no. 142, May/Jun. 1964)
"Galactic Consumer Report No. 1: Inexpensive Time Machines" (from Galaxy Magazine, Dec. 1965)
"Fair" (from New Worlds Science Fiction no. 45, Mar. 1956)
"Such Stuff" (from The Magazine of Fantasy & Science Fiction, Jun. 1962)
"Galactic Consumer Report No. 2: Automatic Twin-Tube Wishing Machines" (from Galaxy Magazine, Jun. 1966)
"Tracking with Close-ups (21) and (23)" (excerpts from Stand on Zanzibar, 1968)
"X-Hero" (from Omni, Mar. 1980)
"No Future in It" (from Science Fantasy, Sep. 1955)
"Galactic Consumer Report No. 3: A Survey of the Membership" (from Galaxy Magazine, Dec. 1967)
"What Friends Are For" (from Fellowship of the Stars, 1974)
"The Taste of the Dish and the Savor of the Day" (from The Magazine of Fantasy & Science Fiction, Aug. 1977)
"Galactic Consumer Report No. 4: Thing-of-the-Month Clubs" (from Galaxy Magazine, Jan. 1969) 
"The Man Who Saw the Thousand-Year Reich" (from The Magazine of Fantasy & Science Fiction, Nov. 1981)
"An Elixir for the Emperor" (from Fantastic Stories of Imagination, Nov. 1964)
"The Suicide of Man" (from Isaac Asimov's Science Fiction Magazine, Jul./Aug. 1978)
"The Vitanuls" (from The Magazine of Fantasy & Science Fiction, Jul. 1967)

Reception
The book was reviewed by Tom Whitmore in Locus no. 334, November 1988.

Awards
The book placed thirteenth in the 1989 Locus Poll Award for Best Collection.

Notes

1988 short story collections
Science fiction short story collections
Del Rey books